Circulus may refer to:

Circulus (album), 1970, by Chick Corea
Circulus (band), a British psychedelic folk and progressive rock band
Circulus (gastropod), a genus of sea snails
Circulus (theory), a socioeconomics doctrine
Circulus (zoology), a type of reptilian social group

See also